Messier 63 or M63, also known as NGC 5055 or the seldom-used Sunflower Galaxy, is a spiral galaxy in the northern constellation of Canes Venatici with approximately 400 billion stars. M63 was first discovered by the French astronomer Pierre Méchain, then later verified by his colleague Charles Messier on June 14, 1779. The galaxy became listed as object 63 in the Messier Catalogue. In the mid-19th century, Anglo-Irish astronomer Lord Rosse identified spiral structures within the galaxy, making this one of the first galaxies in which such structure was identified.

The shape or morphology of this galaxy has a classification of SAbc, indicating a spiral form with no central bar feature (SA) and moderate to loosely wound arms (bc). There is a general lack of large-scale continuous spiral structure in visible light, so it is considered a flocculent galaxy. However, when observed in the near infrared, a symmetric, two-arm structure is seen.

M63 is a weakly active galaxy with a LINER nucleus – short for 'low-ionization nuclear emission-line region'. This displays as an unresolved source at the galactic nucleus that is cloaked in a diffuse emission. The latter is extended along a position angle of 110° relative to the north celestial pole, and both soft X-rays and hydrogen (H-alpha) emission can be observed coming from along nearly the same direction.

The form suggests a dark matter halo that is offset with respect to the inner region. The reason for the warp is unclear, but the position angle points toward the smaller companion galaxy, UGC 8313.

M63 is part of the M51 Group, a group of galaxies that also includes M51 (the 'Whirlpool Galaxy').

In 1971, a supernova with a magnitude of 11.8 appeared in one of the arms. It was discovered on May 24 and reached peak light around May 26. The spectrum of this, is consistent with a supernova of type I. However, the spectroscopic behavior appeared anomalous.

Gallery

See also
 List of Messier objects

References

External links

 
 Sunflower Galaxy @ SEDS Messier pages
 Sunflower Galaxy (M63) at Constellation Guide

Unbarred spiral galaxies
LINER galaxies
M51 Group
Canes Venatici
063
NGC objects
08334
46153
Astronomical objects discovered in 1779